Yang Yi (born 1952) is a Chinese retired para table tennis player. She won a gold, a silver, and a bronze medal at the 1992 Summer Paralympics.

Yang Yi was disabled by polio at age 3. As an adult, her right leg is shorter than her left leg by 5 cm and much thinner. She began playing table tennis seriously in 1986, after her marriage in 1982 and the birth of her son in 1983.

References

1952 births
Chinese female table tennis players
Table tennis players at the 1992 Summer Paralympics
Paralympic table tennis players of China
Medalists at the 1992 Summer Paralympics
Paralympic medalists in table tennis
Paralympic gold medalists for China
Paralympic silver medalists for China
Table tennis players from Guangxi
People from Liuzhou
Living people
People with polio
FESPIC Games competitors